Ringlikon is a railway station situated near the village of Ringlikon in the municipality of Uitikon in Switzerland. The station is on the Uetliberg line, which is operated by the Sihltal Zürich Uetliberg Bahn (SZU).

The station is served by the following passenger trains:

The station has a passing loop and two side platforms, and has no station buildings. Ringlikon village, which is some  distant and  lower, is linked to the station by a footpath.

Gallery

References

External links 
 

Railway stations in the canton of Zürich